Hasan Ahmed may refer to:

 Hassan Ahmed (actor) (born 1982), Pakistani model and TV actor
 Hasan Hafeez Ahmed (1929–1975), Pakistan Navy officer
 Hasan Ahmed (politician), Indian politician
 Hasan Ahmed (cinematographer), Bangladeshi cameraman
 Hassan Ahmed (Ghanaian diplomat) (born 1955)